Bishop Fox's School is a mixed secondary school located in Taunton, Somerset, England.

History
The school traces its history back to the Taunton Grammar School or Tudor Grammar School endowed by the Bishop of Winchester, Richard Foxe, in 1522. The school was housed in what is now referred to as the old Municipal Buildings in Corporation Street. After Taunton Grammar School in Corporation Street closed in 1885, a new girls' grammar school, funded by Bishop Fox's endowment, opened in the former Roman Catholic Church on The Crescent in 1890: it moved to Staplegrove Road in 1895 and to Kingston Road in 1940. It then relocated from Kingston Road into new purpose-built accommodation, on a 30-acre (12.1 ha) site at Bishop Fox Drive, which was opened by Prime Minister, John Major, in 1994.

In September 2003, the school was awarded Specialist Status as a Business and Enterprise College and, in July 2011, it became an Academy. A floodlit astro-turf pitch was installed in summer 2014.

Activities
The school has been awarded the Gold Artsmark Award three times. England cricketer Jack Leach attended the school.

References

External links 
 

Schools in Taunton
Secondary schools in Somerset
Academies in Somerset